Fulham Broadway is a London Underground station on the  branch of the District line. The station is located on Fulham Broadway (A304). It is the nearest station to Stamford Bridge stadium, the home of Chelsea Football Club. The station is in a cutting that was originally open air until it was covered by the 'Fulham Broadway Shopping Centre' development. The line then resurfaces shortly before West Brompton station.

History

The original station building was replaced in 1905 with a new entrance designed by Harry W Ford to accommodate crowds for the newly built Stamford Bridge stadium. It is now a Grade II listed building.

The name was changed to its current form on 1 March 1952 after representations from Fulham Chamber of Commerce.

The station was upgraded in the early 2000s as part of the construction of the Fulham Broadway Shopping Centre over the station, with a new ticket hall, station control room and step free access. New "match day" staircases were added to the far end of the platform, allowing crowds attending Chelsea F.C. games easier entry/exit from the station, avoiding the main ticket hall and shopping centre. The upgraded station opened in 2003, with access via the shopping centre. The original street-level station building at the southern end of the platform was closed, with the original footbridge remaining in situ.

The original station building was then refurbished, with many of the original station signs and architectural features retained, including the historic terracotta block facade. Following a period as a T.G.I. Friday's restaurant, the building has been in use as a food hall since 2018.

Due to the area's poor Underground links, it is the station used locally by many residents of the western part of neighbouring Chelsea.

On the night of 21 May 2008, the station was the scene of riots following Chelsea's defeat by Manchester United in the Champions League Final.

Services
The typical off-peak service is:
12 trains per hour to Wimbledon
6 tph to Edgware Road
3 tph to Barking
3 tph to Tower Hill

During the peak and on Chelsea F.C. matchdays additional services run including services all the way through to Upminster

Cultural references
 In 1998 the station was featured in the film "Sliding Doors" where Gwyneth Paltrow met John Hannah after successfully catching her tube. When they leave the tube, they can be seen walking up the old steps towards the exit. These steps no longer lead to that exit, having been superseded by the new ticket hall described previously; they do remain as a bridge between platforms however.
 Ian Dury and the Blockheads' 1978 single What a Waste contains the line: "I could be the ticket man at Fulham Broadway Station".
 Mentioned in Take That's song "Pretty Things" off their 2010 album "Progress".

Image gallery

Connections
London Buses routes 11, 14, 28, 211, 295, 306, 414, 424, night routes N11 and N28 serve the station.

References

External links
 London Transport Museum Photographic Archive
 
 . The large crowd is composed of football fans attending the FA Cup Final held at Stamford Bridge that year.
 

 

District line stations
Tube stations in the London Borough of Hammersmith and Fulham
Former Metropolitan District Railway stations
Railway stations in Great Britain opened in 1880